The Bibliothèque municipale de Lyon is a library in Lyon, France. In addition to providing standard library services it also hosts a variety of special collections, in particular in the fields of photography, Lyon and the Rhône-Alpes département, old books, textiles, music, contemporary art and literature.

See also

References

External links 
 Official site (Fr)

Public libraries in France
Buildings and structures in Lyon
Culture in Lyon